Radio Savannah is a public radio station in Tamale, the capital town of the Northern region of Ghana. The station is owned and run by the state broadcaster - the Ghana Broadcasting Corporation. Programme content is mostly English, Dagbanli and Gonja

References

Radio stations in Ghana
Northern Region (Ghana)
Mass media in Tamale, Ghana